The National Defence Medal is a French military decoration. It was created by Charles Hernu, Minister of Defence and established by decree on 21 April 1982. It rewards particularly honourable service rendered by military personnel for their participation in operational activities. The medal has three levels: Gold, Silver and Bronze.

Eligibility

For military service
The award is made by decision of the military hierarchy, but the recipients must have achieved a personal minimum of:
 For the Bronze level: 1 year of service and accumulated 90 points;
 For the Silver level: 5 years of service (minimum 2 years in the Bronze level) and accumulated 600 points;
 For the Gold level: 10 years of service (minimum 2 years in the Silver grade) and accumulated 800 points

The yearly quota of Gold and Silver level awards are set by the minister of defence.  Points are earned through participation in exercises, operations, proficiency, initiative, awards received, etc.  People who had been awarded the Légion d'honneur or the Ordre national du Mérite can not receive the National Defence Medal.

Exceptional circumstances
The medal can be awarded in any one of the three levels to:
 Military personnel on active duty or in reserves and civilians killed or injured in the line of duty;
 Active military or reservists which have distinguished themselves by the quality of their service;
 French civilians and foreign military personnel or civilians who have rendered honourable services particularly important to the defence of France

Mention in Dispatches
When an individual is mentioned in dispatches (citation dans les ordres) for heroism not involving actual conflict with an enemy. He or she is awarded the Médaille de la Défense Nationale at the Gold level, adorned with a ribbon device (bronze, silver, silver gilt star or bronze palm) depending on the level (regiment, brigade, division, army) of the mention, in the same manner as for the Croix de Guerre.

Award description

Medal and ribbon
The National Defence Medal is a 36 mm in diameter circular medal struck from bronze, the gold level is gilt, the silver award is silvered.  The obverse bears the relief image of Rude's Marseillaise with the relief inscription along the upper circumference "FRENCH REPUBLIC".  The reverse bears the relief image of a Phrygian cap over a laurel branch and the inscription along the medal circumference in the upper half "ARMY" and "NATION", in the lower half "NATIONAL DEFENSE", the upper and lower inscriptions being separated by a relief five pointed star on each side

The medal hangs from a ring through the medal's suspension loop.  The bronze grade award's ribbon is a 36 mm wide red silk moiré ribbon with a 12 mm wide central blue stripe.  The ribbon for the silver grade award is similar with the addition of 3 mm wide white edge stripes, the edge stripes are yellow for the gold grade award

Clasps

Multiple specialty and geographical clasps are allowed for wear on the ribbon, each grade being allowed a single clasp up to a maximum of three. As of 29 January 2021 the following clasps are awarded:

Geographical clasps
 Corps européen (European Corps)
 Force océanique stratégique (Strategic Oceanic Force)
 Missions d'opérations extérieures (Foreign operational missions)
 Missions d'opérations intérieures (Domestic operational missions)
 Mururoa-Hao (Moruroa-Hao)
 Terres australes et antarctiques (Southern and Antarctic lands)
 Essais Nucléaires (Nuclear Testing)

Speciality clasps
 Armée de l'air (Air Force)
 Défense aérienne (Air defense)
 Soutien des forces aériennes (Air Force support command)
 Forces aériennes (Air Forces Command)
 Forces aériennes stratégiques (Strategic Air Forces Command)
 Génie de l'air (Air Force engineers)
 Service d'infrastructure de la défense (Defence Infrastructure Service)
 Interarmées (Joint forces)
 Service du commissariat des armées (Armed Forces Commissariat Service)
 Journée défense et citoyenneté (Defence and Citizenship Day)
 Armée de terre (Army)
 Arme blindée et cavalerie (Armoured Cavalry)
 Artillerie (Artillery)
 Aviation légère (Light Aviation)
 Génie (Military engineers)
 Infanterie (Infantry)
 Légion étrangère (Foreign Legion)
 Troupes de marine (Marine troops)
 Matériel (Matériel)
 Sapeurs-pompiers (Paris Fire Brigade)
 Sécurité civile (Civil Defence)
 Transmissions (Signal Corps)
 Train (Logistics and transportation)
 Troupes aéroportées (Airborne troops)
 Troupes de montagne (Mountain troops)
 Armement (Weapons)
 Défense 
 État-major (General staff)
 Gendarmerie nationale (National Gendarmerie)
 Écoles de gendarmerie (Gendarmerie schools)
 Formations aériennes de la gendarmerie (National Gendarmerie air units)
 Garde républicaine (Republican Guard)
 Gendarmerie de la sécurité des armements nucléaires (Nuclear Weapons Security Gendarmerie)
 Gendarmerie de l'air (Air Gendarmerie)
 Gendarmerie de l'armement (Armement Gendarmerie)
 Gendarmerie départementale (Departmental Gendarmerie)
 Gendarmerie des transports aériens (Air Transport Gendarmerie)
 Gendarmerie d'outre-mer (Overseas Gendarmerie)
 Gendarmerie maritime (Maritime Gendarmerie)
 Gendarmerie mobile (Mobile Gendarmerie)
 Justice militaire (Military justice)
 Marine nationale (Navy)
 Aéronautique navale (Naval Aviation)
 Bâtiments de combat (Warships)
 Fusiliers marins (Naval Infantry)
 Marins pompiers (Marseille Naval Fire Battalion)
 Nageurs de combat (Combat swimmer)
 Plongeurs démineurs (Clearance diver)
 Sous-marins (Submarines)
 Poste interarmées (Military postal service)
 Service de santé (Defence Health Service)
 Service des essences (Military Fuel Service)
 Cyber (Cyber Defence Command)
 Musique

Obsolete clasps
 Forces françaises stationnées en Allemagne
 Missions d'assistance extérieure
 Commissariat armée de terre
 Force Aérienne Tactique
 Fusiliers Commandos de l'Air
 Transport Aérien
 Intendance
 Commandement air des systèmes de surveillance, d'information et de communications
 Commandement des Écoles de l'Armée de l'Air
 Force Aérienne de Combat
 Force Aérienne de Projection
 Forces de protection et de sécurité de l'armée de l'air

Notable recipients (partial list)

Gold grade
USN RDML Frank Whitworth
Paris firefighter master corporal Christophe Dubois
Athlete Cyril Soyer
General Denis Mercier

Silver grade
General Bruno Dary
Admiral Pierre-François Forissier
Général de corps d'armée Bruno Clément-Bollée
 General Francis Pollet
Admiral Bernard Rogel
USA SFC Geoffrey Bright
USA SGT Robert Hames
USA SPC Rawan Abudahrieh
USA CPT Jonathon Seaman
USA CPT Katie Troxell
Uganda Brigadier General Bob Paciesky Ogiki
USMC Maj Matthew Simmons
USMC Capt Randall Nickel
USN LT James Walsh

Bronze grade
Admiral Édouard Guilaud
General Benoît Puga
General Xavier Bout de Marnhac
Prince Jean, Duke of Vendome
Prince Charles Philippe, Duke of Anjou
Jean, Count of Paris
Police colonel Isabelle Guion de Méritens
Police major Bruno Beschizza
Naval reserve lieutenant commander Jean-Jacques Brot
Police brigadier general Thierry Orosco
General Antoine Lecerf
Gendarmerie nationale général d'armée Denis Favier
Sailor Bruno Sevaistre
Captain USAF Steven Shultz
Colonel George Petrolekas, MSM, CD (Canadian Army) with "interarmees" clasp
USA CPT Scott Curtis with "Armée De Terre" clasp
USA SGT Kyle "Clyde" Hall with "Armée De Terre" clasp
USA SPC Brian Sinclair
USA SPC Matthew "Hem-dog" Hemmer
Cyprus Air Force Sergeant Kyritsis Evangelos with "Armée Del Air" clasp
USAF Capt William Palmer with "Armée Del Air" clasp
Brigadier General Imre Zoltan Porkolab (Hungarian Defence Forces)
USMC Maj Daniel Geisenhof with "Armée De Terre" clasp
British Lieutenant Colonel Ian Comber with "Armée De Terre" clasp

Exceptional circumstances
USA Major General Charles Hooper (Gold grade with clasp "INFANTERIE")
USA Lieutenant Colonel Jeff Ritsick (Gold grade with clasp "INFANTERIE")

Mentions in dispatches
USAF Captain John Mosier (Gold grade with bronze star)
USAF Technical Sergeant Kristopher Burridge (Gold grade with bronze star)
USAF Senior Airman Jackson Rogers (Gold grade with bronze star)

See also

 Ribbons of the French military and civil awards

References

Sources
 http://www.france-phaleristique.com/accueil.htm
 https://web.archive.org/web/20110710193646/http://www.entente-combattants-herault.com/decorations.html

Defense nationale
Defense nationale
Awards established in 1982
1982 establishments in France